Limpia Canyon is a deep valley or canyon in the Davis Mountains of Jeff Davis County, Texas.

History
Limpia Canyon was the route of the San Antonio-El Paso Road out of the Pecos River Valley into the Davis Mountains.

References

Landforms of Jeff Davis County, Texas
San Antonio–El Paso Road